Nikolayevka is a rural locality (a settlement) in Alexeyevsky District, Belgorod Oblast, Russia. The population was 25 as of 2010. There is 1 street.

References 

Rural localities in Alexeyevsky District, Belgorod Oblast